Clémence Guichard (born 30 October 1982), known professionally as Clémence Poésy, is a French actress and fashion model. After starting on the stage as a child, Poésy studied drama and has been active in both film and television since 1999, including some English-language productions. She is known for the roles of Fleur Delacour in the Harry Potter film series, Chloë in In Bruges, Rana in 127 Hours, Natasha Rostova in War and Peace, and the lead role as Elise Wassermann in the 24-episode series The Tunnel.

Early life and education
Born in L'Haÿ-les-Roses, a southern suburb of Paris, she is the daughter of actor-writer Étienne Guichard and a French teacher. Poésy took her mother's maiden name as her stage name. She was sent to an alternative school in Meudon.

Her father gave Poésy her first acting job when she was a child; then she had two lines at age 14. She has a younger sister, Maëlle Poésy-Guichard, who is also an actress.

After leaving La Source, the bilingual, alternative school she attended until the age of 16, Poésy studied drama at the Conservatoire National Supérieur d'Art Dramatique (CNSAD, the French National Academy of Dramatic Arts), the Atelier International de Blanche Salant et Paul Weaver, and Paris Nanterre University.

Acting career

Poésy's first English-speaking role was in the BBC mini-series Gunpowder, Treason & Plot (2004), in which she portrayed Mary, Queen of Scots, subsequently winning the 2005 Golden FIPA for actress in a TV Series and Serial.

In 2005, Poésy appeared in the Harry Potter franchise as Fleur Delacour in The Goblet of Fire. Between 2006 and 2007, she worked in a number of film and television productions, including the 2007 mini-series War and Peace.

In 2008, Poésy starred in the Academy Award-nominated film In Bruges, alongside Colin Farrell, and Harry Potter co-stars Ralph Fiennes and Brendan Gleeson. In 2009, Poésy appeared in Heartless opposite Jim Sturgess. She reprised her role as Fleur Delacour in both Harry Potter and the Deathly Hallows movies. She played Chuck Bass's new French girlfriend, Eva, in the fourth season of the CW hit show Gossip Girl.

In 2010, Poésy appeared alongside James Franco in 127 Hours, directed by Danny Boyle. 127 Hours was screened at the Toronto International Film Festival on 12 September 2010, following its premiere at the 2010 Telluride Film Festival.

In 2011, she appeared alongside Rupert Friend in Lullaby for Pi, a romantic drama and Benoit Philippon's directorial debut. The film is about a jazz singer (Friend) whose wife has just died and who meets a mysterious woman (Poésy). Forest Whitaker also starred. She can be heard singing on the album Colour of the Trap by Miles Kane. She is featured on the track "Happenstance".

She worked alongside Michael Caine in Mr. Morgan's Last Love, and in 2012 made her Broadway debut in Cyrano de Bergerac as Roxane.

In 2013, Poésy was the female lead in the Sky Atlantic/Canal+ series The Tunnel, which comprised 24 episodes over three series. In 2019, she played the part of Yelena in Chekhov's Uncle Vanya at the Theatre Royal in Bath.

Modelling career
Poésy has been featured in numerous magazines, including the covers of i-D, on French magazine Jalouse twice, on Australia's Yen, and on Nylon. Since October 2007, Poésy has been one of three spokesmodels for the self-titled fragrance by Chloé, and has modelled in Gap's 2008 autumn advertising campaign.

In December 2011, Poésy was chosen as the face of the designer clothing company G-Star Raw. In 2014, she became the poster girl for the "Love Story" fragrance from Chloé.

Personal life
Poésy is fluent in French and English, and speaks some Italian and Spanish. She divides her time between homes in Paris and London, and has spent some time in Eastern Europe. Politically, she identifies as "very clearly on the left".

In early 2017, she gave birth to a son, Liam. In 2019, while filming Tenet, she was pregnant with her second child. At the Deauville American Film Festival 2021 she was pregnant with her third child.

Filmography

Film

Television

Theatre

Decorations
 Chevalier of the Order of Arts and Letters (2015)

Awards and nominations  

For her work as an actress…

References

External links

 
 

1982 births
French female models
French film actresses
French television actresses
French stage actresses
Living people
Paris Nanterre University alumni
People from L'Haÿ-les-Roses
20th-century French actresses
21st-century French actresses
Chevaliers of the Ordre des Arts et des Lettres